David Lauchlan Urquhart, Baron Tayside OBE (13 September 1912 - 12 March 1975) was a Scottish business man and life peer.

Early life 
David Urquhart attended the Harris Academy in Dundee, Scotland until 1930.

Career 
Urquhart became chairman and managing director of the Don Brothers, Buist and Company, an established jute and linen mill which was the largest employer in Forfar. He was also vice president of the Tayside Area Consultative Committee for Economic Planning. 

During the government of prime minister Harold Wilson, Urquhart became a member of the Labour Party in 1967 and was created life peer with the title Baron Tayside of Queens Well in the Royal Burgh of Forfar and County of Angus on 15 September 1967. He gave four speeches in the eight years he was a member of the House of Lords, which focused on the economics of Scotland.

He was president of the Chamber of Commerce of Dundee from 1967 and magistrate, and from 1957 to 1961 leader of the parish council in Forfar. Additionally, he was a member of the board of Grampian Television.

Honors 
Urquhart was appointed an Officer of the Order of the British Empire (OBE) in the 1966 Birthday Honours.

Personal life 
He lived in The Manor in Forfar. He was married in 1939 and his wife had survived him by thirty years.

References 

1912 births
1975 deaths
Labour Party (UK) life peers
People educated at Harris Academy
People associated with Dundee
Life peers created by Elizabeth II